Wildcat is a 1942 American drama film directed by Frank McDonald and written by Richard Murphy and Maxwell Shane. The film stars Richard Arlen, Arline Judge, William Frawley, Buster Crabbe, Arthur Hunnicutt, Elisha Cook, Jr. and Ralph Sanford. The film was released on September 3, 1942, by Paramount Pictures.

Plot

Oil man Johnny Maverick dubs a young hitchhiker "Chicopee" after the name of his hometown, then makes him a full partner, digging for oil. Chicopee is killed in a rig accident, however, and rival Mike Rawlins then sabotages the rig.

Things get worse for Johnny when con artists Nan and Oliver turn up. She pretends to be Chicopee's sister, so Johnny gullibly gives her the half-interest in his oil rig.

Rawlins buys up Johnny's outstanding debts and intends to take over. In an act of desperation, Johnny uses nitroglycerine to blast open an oil well, resulting in a gusher. An explosion ends up knocking Rawlins unconscious and pinning Johnny beneath the wreckage, but Nan, having fallen in love with Johnny, comes to his rescue.

Cast
Richard Arlen as Johnny Maverick
Arline Judge as Nan Deering
William Frawley as Oliver Westbrook
Buster Crabbe as Mike Rawlins 
Arthur Hunnicutt as 'Watchfob' Jones
Elisha Cook, Jr. as Harold 'Chicopee' Nevins
Ralph Sanford as 'Grits' O'Malley
Alec Craig as Joseph D. Campbell
John Dilson as Gus Sloane
Will Wright as John 'Paw' Smithers
Jessica Newcombe as Martha 'Maw' Smithers
William Benedict as Bud Smithers

Production
The film was based on a story by North Bigbee, a journalist who had worked in the oil industry, which was purchased by Pine-Thomas Productions. They assigned it to star Richard Arlen, after he did Torpedo Boat for the studio.

Pine-Thomas wanted a "Jean Harlow type" for the female lead and even tested Harlow's stand in. Jean Wallace was originally announced for the role but did not appear in the final movie. She was replaced by Arline Judge who signed a three picture deal with Pine-Thomas.

The film reportedly had Pine-Thomas' biggest budget yet to date.

References

External links 
 
Wildcat at TCMDB
Review at Variety
Complete film at Internet Archive

1942 films
1940s English-language films
American drama films
1942 drama films
Paramount Pictures films
Films directed by Frank McDonald
Films scored by Freddie Rich
American black-and-white films
1940s American films